Center for Human Rights and Constitutional Law (CHRCL) is a nonprofit center incorporated in 1980 that provides legal services to vulnerable individuals including victims of human and civil rights violations. CHRCL focuses on litigation of children at the federal level. CHCRL has permission to access federal facilities where immigrant children are held, and is the only NGO to have that authority.

Overview
The Center for Human Rights and Constitutional Law (CHRCL) was incorporated in 1980.

Board of Directors

The board of directors includes Peter Schey, who is CHRCL's executive director along with "civil rights attorneys, community advocates and religious leaders".

Operations
CHCRL's work includes federal litigation on behalf of children of refugees and immigrants.

Immigrant children detention centers
By December 31, 2018, CHRCL oversaw the court-ordered agreement on how "migrant children" could be housed. The CHRCL is the only NGO with the authority to do the inspections and assessments of all facilities holding immigrant children.

Schey notified the Department of Justice Civil Division's Office of Immigration Litigation (OIL) of violations of the Flores Settlement Agreement. 
According to a 2019 CBS News article,  over "250 lawyers, doctors and paralegals" from CHRCL visited detention centers and "interviewed hundreds of detained children". They found that the "whole program" managed by the Office of Refugee Resettlement (ORR) agencywhich is mandated to oversee all the shelters for these unaccompanied childrenwas "in total violation".

Flores Settlement Agreement

Detailed regulations on how facilities that care for immigrant children are defined under the 1997 Flores Settlement, which also establishes standards for licensing these. The settlement's standards include the requirement that "licensed programs shall comply with all applicable state child welfare laws and regulations and all state and local building, fire, health and safety codes."

Drugs administered to children
According to an April 2018 lawsuit filed by the center, a "range of psychotropic drugs" were "routinely and forcibly" administered to traumatized children in youth shelters that funded by the U.S. government.

Notes

Citations

References

 
 
 
 
 

Human rights organizations
Human rights organizations based in the United States
Non-profit organizations based in Falls Church, Virginia
Organizations established in 1997